The Östgöta Logistic Corps (T 6) was a Swedish Army logistic unit operating between 1902 and 1927. The unit was for the longest time based in Linköping.

History
Östgöta Logistic Corps was formed as the 2nd Göta Logistic Corps (No 6), according to the 1901 Riksdag decision. The corps belonged to the 2nd Army Division. The corps was raised in November 1902 at Wendes Logistic Corps in Landskrona. The corps was initially placed in this corps' barracks. Its 1st Logistic Company was formed in 1902 and in the summer of 1903 the first enlisted conscripts enrolled. In the autumn of 1904, the 2nd Logistic Company and the 3rd Medical Company were formed. In December of the same year, the corps received the name Östgöta Logistic Corps. On 1 January 1907, the corps received its own commander. Before that, it had been commanded by the commander of the Wendes Logistic Corps. By General Order 1377–1906, it was decided that the corps would be temporarily located in Ränneslätt next to Eksjö in Småland Hussar Regiment's (Smålands husarregemente) old barracks. On 30 August 1907, the move took place from Scania. The next change in the units' history took place through the ordinance of 11 October 1907, when the treasury affairs were separated from matters concerning provisioning, quartermaster equipment and suchlike. This meant that the Administration Department was divided into six new departments and one Cash Administration. In December 1911, the corps finally reached its final location, when they moved into newly built barracks in Linköping.

In connection with the Defence Act of 1925, it was intended that two logistic corps would be disbanded. The corps in question were Västmanland Logistic Corps (T 5) and Östgöta Logistic Corps (T 6). However, Östgöta Logistic Corps was not a completely given candidate for disbandment, as it was considered to have a better location compared to what Svea Logistic Corps had. The decision was that the oldest corps would remain, which was Svea Logistic Corps. As a compromise in the matter, it was decided that Svea Logistic Corps would be relocated from Örebro to Linköping and take over Östgöta Logistic Corps's barracks. The latter corps was disbanded on 31 December 1927. In the autumn of 1927, the relocation of Svea Logistic Corps began and on 1 June 1928, the triple-tailed flag  was hauled for the last time at Västra Mark in Örebro. Only four officers accompanied the move. On the other hand, the majority of the employees at Östgöta Logistic Corps remained in corresponding positions at Svea Logistic Corps.

Locations and training areas
When the unit was formed, it was placed in the same barracks as Wendes Logistic Corps at Slottsgatan in Landskrona. On 21 August 1907, the unit was relocated to Ränneslätt, where they took over the camp that Småland Hussar Regiment (Smålands husarregemente) had left before their move to Eksjö. However, the move to Ränneslätt was only temporary, when the unit was relocated on 19 December 1911 to Kaserngatan in Linköping, where a completely new barracks area had been built. From 1 January 1928, the barracks area was taken over by the Svea Logistic Corps. The barracks area was completely abandoned on 1 July 1985, when Svea Logistic Corps was co-located with other units at Regementsgatan in Linköping.

Commanding officers
1902–1907: Ivar Virgin
1907–1917: Karl Sterner
1917–1919: Knut Palm
1919–1927: Axel Engdahl

Names, designations and locations
Note: The word träng ("train") as in trängregemente is translated to either "train", "service force"; "transport"; "baggage"; "supply vehicles" pl.; (Br) "army service corps", (US) "maintenance and supply troops", "transportation" (adj.), or "logistic".

See also
List of Swedish logistic regiments

Footnotes

References

Notes

Print

Web

Further reading

Logistic corps of Sweden
Disbanded units and formations of Sweden
Military units and formations established in 1902
Military units and formations disestablished in 1927
Linköping Garrison